Seongdong-dong was a dong or a neighbourhood of the Gyeongju City, North Gyeongsang province, South Korea. It was bordered by Dongcheon-dong on the east, Seongnae-dong on the west, Hwango-dong on the south and Yonggang-dong on the north. Its 0.64 square kilometers were home to about 4672 people. It was both an administrative dong and legal dong.

See also
Subdivisions of Gyeongju
Administrative divisions of South Korea

References

External links
 The official site of the Gyeongju city

Subdivisions of Gyeongju